Fabia Trabaldo (born 5 March 1972 in Borgosesia, Vercelli) is a retired Italian middle distance runner who specialized in the 800 and 1500 metres.

Biography
She won one medal, at senior level, at the International athletics competitions. She has 12 caps in national team from 1988 to 1994.

Achievements

National titles
Fabia Trabaldo has won 4 times the individual national championship.
1 win in the 800 metres (1991)
3 wins in the 1500 metres (1991, 1992, 1993)

References

External links
 

1972 births
Living people
Italian female middle-distance runners
Athletes (track and field) at the 1992 Summer Olympics
Olympic athletes of Italy
Mediterranean Games silver medalists for Italy
Athletes (track and field) at the 1993 Mediterranean Games
World Athletics Championships athletes for Italy
Mediterranean Games medalists in athletics
People from Borgosesia
Sportspeople from the Province of Vercelli